Maid in Manhattan is a 2002 American romantic comedy-drama film directed by Wayne Wang and based on a story by John Hughes, who is credited using a pseudonym. It stars Jennifer Lopez, Ralph Fiennes, and Natasha Richardson. In the film, a hotel maid and a high-profile politician fall in love. The film was released on December 13, 2002, by Columbia Pictures and was a box office success, grossing $154 million against its $55 million budget, while receiving mixed reviews.

Plot
Marisa Ventura, a single mother raising her 10-year-old son Ty, works as a maid at the Beresford Hotel in the heart of Manhattan. When not in school, Ty spends time with Marisa's fellow hotel workers, who think she can be promoted to management.

While Marisa and her co-worker Stephanie are cleaning the room of socialite Caroline Lane, Stephanie convinces Marisa to try on a Dolce & Gabbana coat. Lane had previously asked for it to be returned to the store, and Stephanie argues that it "technically" does not belong to anyone at the moment. Elsewhere in the hotel, Ty befriends hotel guest and senatorial candidate Christopher "Chris" Marshall, whom Ty learns has an interest in Richard Nixon, the subject of his school presentation. Ty wants to go with Chris to walk his dog and the pair go to Caroline's room to ask Marisa for permission. Chris meets Marisa, who is wearing the designer coat, and is instantly smitten with her. He assumes that she is Caroline. The trio spend some time together at the park. Though Marisa and Chris are attracted to each other, Marisa is terrified that management will find out about the ruse and makes it a point to avoid Chris afterwards.

Chris asks the hotel's head butler, Lionel Bloch, to invite "Caroline Lane" to lunch, but is confused when the real Caroline shows up instead of Marisa. Marisa was present when she received the invitation and even offered Caroline advice on what to wear for their "lunch à deux". When the real Caroline shows up, Chris asks his assistant Jerry Siegal to find "the other Caroline Lane", promising that he will attend an important dinner and wishes her to go with him. Jerry asks Lionel to find her. Lionel, who has figured out that Marisa is the woman Chris has been looking for, tells her to go to the dinner and end the affair swiftly if she wants a future in hotel management. Stephanie and the hotel staff assist her in preparing for the evening by styling her hair and loaning her an expensive dress and spectacular necklace.

Marisa is unable to end the affair, and she spends the night in Chris' hotel room. The next morning, Marisa is spotted by the real Caroline and her friend leaving Chris' room. Caroline blurts out the truth to the hotel management and Marisa is fired in front of Chris in Lane's hotel suite. Both Marisa and Chris spend time apart with him still thinking about her. Marisa is also hounded by the media and her disapproving mother Veronica.

Some time later, Marisa secures another job as a maid at another hotel. Chris is giving a news conference at the same hotel. Ty attends it and asks Chris whether people should be forgiven if they make mistakes, referencing former President of the United States Richard Nixon. Ty leads him to the staff room where Marisa is having her break. Chris and Marisa are reunited, and the film ends with images of publications showing that Chris has been elected, he and Marisa are still together after a year, and Marisa and her maid friends have been promoted to management.

Cast

Production
The film was originally titled The Chambermaid, and then Uptown Girl. It was described as a Cinderella-type story. John Hughes was initially announced as the film's director, with Hilary Swank set to star as the lead. Variety confirmed in July 2001 that Jennifer Lopez was in negotiations to star in The Chambermaid, with Hughes no longer directing the project. Swank was no longer involved in the film. Ralph Fiennes signed on to star in the film in February 2002. Natasha Richardson joined the cast in April 2002. The film's title was confirmed as Maid in Manhattan in August 2002. Describing the character of Marisa, Lopez said: "She's Puerto Rican. She's from the Bronx. She has this young son and she's just trying to make ends meet. Every day she gets on the train to work. She goes to this big city of dreams and she wants more. She has aspirations in that way." Fiennes' character was originally a wealthy British guest.

Principal photography commenced in New York City in April, just months after the terrorist attacks of September 11, 2001 in which the towers of the World Trade Center (visible in some unused pre-production footage) were destroyed, and concluded by June 2002. Filming was carried out at both New York's Roosevelt Hotel and the Waldorf-Astoria Hotel. Filming also took place in the Morris Heights section of the Bronx on E 175 Street between the Grand Concourse and on Jerome Avenue. John Hughes wrote the story, but was credited as Edmond Dantes. On the film's first day of production in The Bronx, paparazzi and spectators forced filming to stop, and police were called as a result of the pandemonium. Wayne Wang said "No one in the production was prepared for it."

Soundtrack
The film features Paul Simon's "Me and Julio Down by the Schoolyard" in the opening credits, "Lovergirl" sung by Teena Marie, "Train on a Track" sung by Kelly Rowland, "Come Away with Me" and "Don't Know Why" sung by Norah Jones, Michael Jackson's  "Fall Again" sung by Glenn Lewis, Paul Simon's "Kathy's Song" sung by Eva Cassidy and "I'm Coming Out" sung by Amerie.

Reception

Box office
Maid in Manhattan opened at 2,838 theaters in the United States, reaching number one at the box office in its opening weekend with $18.7 million, beating out Star Trek: Nemesis, by less than $200,000. It earned a total of $94 million domestically, and $60.9 million in other countries, for a total gross of $154.8 million worldwide.

Critical response
Maid in Manhattan received mixed reviews from film critics. On the review aggregator Rotten Tomatoes, the film holds a rating of 38% based on 151 reviews, with an average rating of 5.10/10. The website's critics consensus reads: "Too blandly generic, Maid in Manhattan also suffers from a lack of chemistry between Lopez and Fiennes." Metacritic assigned the film a weighted average score of 45 out of 100, based on 32 critics, indicating "mixed or average reviews". Audiences polled by CinemaScore gave the film an average grade of "B+" on an A+ to F scale.

Time magazine named it one of the top 10 worst chick flicks. According to Anna Smith of the magazine Empire: "the film constantly falls back on its staple fairy-tale plotline, which is so resolutely traditional it should succeed in charming its target audience". Nell Minow of Common Sense Media wrote positively, stating: "is as careful a combination of ingredients as it is possible to package [sic]. Everything is at the fairy tale level, which means we never dwell on troubling realities". Paul Byrnes of the Sydney Morning Herald said: "The script is so lazy it snores, and Wayne Wang directs like he walked onto the wrong set – true enough, in its way." Rich Cline of the webzine Film Threat reviewed Maid in Manhattan positively. Cline wrote: "When we catch ourselves sighing at the end, we get mad that we've fallen for this same old formula all over again. But mad in a nice way." Roger Ebert wrote that the film is a "skillful, glossy, formula picture, given life by the appeal of its stars".

Charles Passy of The Atlanta Journal-Constitution gave it a negative review, writing: "Instead of a fairy tale, we have a tale told without imagination. It's Cinderella gone stale." Andrew Chase of Killer Movie Reviews, however, was more positive. Chase wrote: "Leave reality at the concession stand along with your $20 for popcorn, candy and a large drink". Derek Adams of Time Out wrote: "Talented individuals labour over the contrivances in this lightweight romance, and if the result's fluff, at least it's painless."

Lopez's casting in the film sparked some debate. Variety commented that "[m]aking the maid a Latina is certainly realistic but never quite avoids the suggestion that upward mobility is best achieved through marriage into Anglo society". Fade to Black and White: Interracial Images in Popular Culture (2009) author Erica Chito Childs noted aspects of the film to expose the objective sides of a biracial relationship using the "symbolic roles of maid and politician". Writer Betty Kaklamanidou praised Lopez's casting in the film which "proved that a Latin actress can move away from stereotypical supporting roles and effectively become the center of a romantic narrative".

Accolades

Spin-off
ABC announced in August 2008 that it would be adapting the film to a television series, with Lopez producing. Chad Hodge was hired as a script writer. In 2009, Sony Pictures Television indicated the spin-off was a put pilot.

Telenovela version
Telemundo and Sony Pictures Television were co-producing a telenovela based on the movie called Una Maid en Manhattan, starring Litzy and Eugenio Siller. As of November 29, 2011, the telenovela was airing in Telemundo weeknights at 8pm/7pm central.

References

External links
 
 

2002 films
2002 romantic comedy-drama films
2000s English-language films
American romantic comedy-drama films
Columbia Pictures films
Films about social class
Films directed by Wayne Wang
Films scored by Alan Silvestri
Films set in hotels
Films set in New York City
Films shot in New York City
Films with screenplays by Kevin Wade
Impact of the September 11 attacks on cinema
Maids in films
Revolution Studios films
2000s American films